The Tracy Morgan Show is an American television sitcom created by David M. Israel and Jim O'Doherty, that aired on NBC from December 2, 2003 to March 27, 2004. The series stars Tracy Morgan and Tamala Jones. The show was canceled in its first season after 16 episodes (the other 2 were never aired).

Synopsis
Tracy Morgan portrays "Tracy Mitchell", who is the owner of an auto repair garage. He has a wife named Alicia (Tamala Jones), a teenaged son named Derrick (Marc John Jefferies) and a seven-year-old named Jimmy (Bobb'e J. Thompson) as well as Aunt Pearl (Esther Scott).

Cast

Main
 Tracy Morgan – Tracy Mitchell
 Tamala Jones – Alicia Mitchell
 Marc John Jefferies – Derrick Mitchell
 Bobb'e J. Thompson – Jimmy Mitchell
 Katt Williams – Freddie
 John Witherspoon – Spoon
 Heavy D – Bernard

Supporting
 Bre Blair – Marcy
 Keesha Sharp – Linda Berry
 Myzel Robinson – Robert Berry
 Debra Jo Rupp – Ms. Laneworthy
 Tracy Morgan, Jr. – Superintendent Albano/Jack

Production
The series was created by David Israel and Jim O'Doherty, who also served as executive producers. Additional executive producers include Marcy Carsey, Caryn Mandabach, Lorne Michaels, David Miner, and Tom Werner.

Cast member Heavy D composed the series' music and theme song.

Bobb'e J. Thompson would go on to play a Tracy Morgan character's son a second time in the hit series 30 Rock.

Episodes

Broadcast and syndication
In 2006, The Box Comedy aired the series, including the two unaired episodes. It disappeared when the channel was transformed to Comedy Central, until it was rerun in 2010. The show is currently aired by Comedy Central Family. On May 31, 2010, TV One aired the series in its entirety, including the two unaired episodes.

Awards and nominations

References

External links
 Official Website
 Carsey-Werner - The Tracy Morgan Show
 
 

2003 American television series debuts
2004 American television series endings
2000s American black sitcoms
English-language television shows
NBC original programming
Television series about families
Television series by Universal Television
Television series by Carsey-Werner Productions
Television shows set in New York City
Television series by Broadway Video